The 2000–01 Asian Club Championship was the 20th edition of the annual international club football competition held in the AFC region (Asia). It determined that year's club champion of association football in Asia.

Suwon Samsung Bluewings of South Korea won the final and became Asian champions for the first time, beating 1-0 Júbilo Iwata who were playing in their third consecutive final.

First round

West Asia

|}
1 Al-Ansar withdrew. 
2 FC Dustlik did not show up for the 1st leg in Dushanbe due to the civil war in Tajikistan; they were ejected from the competition and fined $10,000.

East Asia

|}

Second round

West Asia

|}

East Asia

|}

Quarter-finals

West Asia

East Asia

Semi-finals

Third place match

Final

References

Asian Club Competitions 2001 at RSSSF.com

1
1
2000-01